The Union of European Football Associations (UEFA) is the administrative and controlling body for European futsal. It consists of 54 member associations, each of which is responsible for governing futsal in their respective countries.

All widely recognised sovereign states located entirely within Europe are members, with the exceptions of the United Kingdom, Monaco and Vatican City. Eight states partially or entirely outside of Europe are also members: Armenia, Azerbaijan, Russia, Georgia, Kazakhstan, Israel, Cyprus and Turkey.

The United Kingdom is divided into the four separate football associations of England, Northern Ireland, Scotland, and Wales; each association has a separate UEFA membership.

Each UEFA member has its own futsal league system, except Liechtenstein. Clubs playing in each top-level league compete for the title as the country's club champions. Clubs also compete in the league or national cup competitions for places in the following season's UEFA club competitions, the UEFA Futsal Champions League.

UEFA coefficients

The UEFA league coefficients, also known as the UEFA rankings, are used to rank the leagues of Europe, and thus determine the number of clubs from a league that will participate in UEFA Futsal Cup.

A country's ranking is calculated based on the results of its clubs in UEFA competitions over the past five seasons. Two points are awarded for each win by a club, and one for a draw. If a game goes to extra time, the result at the end of time is used to calculate ranking points; if the match goes to a penalty shootout, it is considered to be a draw for the purposes of the coefficient system. The number of points awarded to a country's clubs are added together, and then divided by the number of clubs that participated in European competitions that season.

Albania

 Country: 
 Association: Football Association of Albania
 Top-level league: Albanian Futsal Championship
 UEFA ranking:

Clubs and locations as of the 2013–14 season:

Andorra

 Country: 
 Association: Andorran Football Federation
 Top-level league: Primera Divisió (futsal)
 UEFA ranking:

Clubs and locations as of the 2013–14 season:

Armenia

 Country: 
 Association: Football Federation of Armenia
 Top-level league: Armenian Futsal Premier League
 UEFA Ranking:

Clubs and locations as of the 2013–14 season:

Austria

 Country: 
 Association: Austrian Football Association
 Top-level league: Austrian Futsal Liga 
 UEFA ranking:

Clubs and locations as of the 2013–14 season:

Azerbaijan

 Country: 
 Association: Association of Football Federations of Azerbaijan
 Top-level league: Azerbaijan Premier League (futsal) 
 UEFA ranking:

Clubs and locations as of the 2013–14 season:

Belarus

 Country: 
 Association: Football Federation of Belarus
 Top-level league: Belarusian Futsal Premier League 
 UEFA ranking:Clubs and locations as of the 2014 season:Belgium

 Country: 
 Association: Belgian Football Association
 Top-level league: Belgian Futsal Division 1
 UEFA ranking:Clubs and locations as of the 2013–14 season:Bosnia and Herzegovina

 Country: 
 Association: Football Association of Bosnia and Herzegovina
 Top-level league: Futsal League of Bosnia and Herzegovina 
 UEFA ranking:

Bulgaria

 Country: 
 Association: Bulgarian Football Union
 Top-level league: Bulgarian Premiere Futsal League
 UEFA ranking:

Croatia

 Country: 
 Association: Croatian Football Federation
 Top-level league: Croatian First Futsal League 
 UEFA ranking: 15thClubs and locations as of the 2013–14 season:Cyprus

 Country: 
 Association: Cyprus Football Association
 Top-level league: Cypriot Futsal First Division 
 UEFA ranking:Clubs and locations as of the 2013–14 season:Play-off:

Czech Republic

 Country: 
 Association: Football Association of the Czech Republic
 Top-level league: Czech Futsal First League
 UEFA ranking: 5thClubs and locations as of the 2013–14 season:Denmark

 Country: 
 Association: Danish Football Association
 Top-level league: Danish Futsal Championship 
 UEFA ranking:

England

 Country: 
 Association: The Football Association
 Top-level league: FA National Futsal Series
 UEFA ranking: 30Clubs and locations as of the 2019–20 season:

update=27/04/2020 
|source=THEFA.com

Estonia

 Country: 
 Association: Estonian Football Association
 Top-level league: Saalijalgpalli Meistriliiga
 UEFA ranking:

Faroe Islands

 Country: 
 Association: Faroe Islands Football Association
 Top-level league: None UEFA ranking:

Finland

 Country: 
 Association: Football Association of Finland
 Top-level league: Futsal-Liiga
 UEFA ranking:

France

 Country: 
 Association: French Football Federation
 Top-level league: Championnat de France de Futsal
 UEFA ranking: 18Clubs and locations as of the 2014–15 season:Georgia

 Country: 
 Association: Georgian Football Federation
 Top-level league: Georgian Futsal League 
 UEFA ranking:

Germany

 Country: 
 Association: German Football Association
 Top-level league: None Top-level championship: DFB Futsal Cup
 UEFA ranking:

Greece

 Country: 
 Association: Hellenic Football Federation
 Top-level league: Hellenic Futsal Premiere League
 UEFA ranking:

Hungary

 Country: 
 Association: Hungarian Football Federation
 Top-level league: Hungarian National Championship
 UEFA ranking:

As of the 2019–20 season.

Iceland

 Country: 
 Association: Football Association of Iceland
 Top-level league: Icelandic Futsal First Division 
 UEFA ranking:

Israel

 Country: 
 Association: Israel Football Association
 Top-level league: Israeli Futsal League 
 UEFA ranking:

Italy

 Country: 
 Association: Federazione Italiana Giuoco Calcio
 Top-level league: Serie A (futsal) 
 UEFA ranking: 7thClubs and locations as of the 2013–14 season:Kazakhstan

 Country: 
 Association: Football Union of Kazakhstan
 Top-level league: Kazakhstani Futsal Championship
 UEFA ranking:Clubs and locations as of the 2013–14 season:

Latvia

 Country: 
 Association: Latvian Football Federation
 Top-level league: Latvian Futsal Premier League 
 UEFA ranking:

Liechtenstein

 Country: 
 Association: Liechtenstein Football Association
 Top-level league: None
 UEFA ranking:

Lithuania

 Country: 
 Association: Lithuanian Football Federation
 Top-level league: Lithuanian Futsal Championship
 UEFA ranking:

Luxembourg

 Country: 
 Association: Luxembourg Football Federation
 Top-level league: None
 UEFA ranking:

Malta

 Country: 
 Association: Malta Football Association
 Top-level league: Maltese Futsal First Division 
 UEFA ranking:

Moldova

 Country: 
 Association: Football Association of Moldova
 Top-level league: Moldovan Futsal National Division
 UEFA ranking:

Montenegro

 Country: 
 Association: Football Association of Montenegro
 Top-level league: Montenegrin Futsal First League 
 UEFA ranking:

Netherlands

 Country: 
 Association: Royal Dutch Football Association
 Top-level league: Topdivisie
 UEFA ranking: 
Clubs and locations as of the 2013–14 season:

Northern Ireland

 Country: 
 Association: Irish Football Association
 Top-level league: None
 UEFA ranking:

Norway

 Country: 
 Association: Football Association of Norway (NFF)
 Top-level league: NFF Futsal Eliteserie 
 UEFA ranking:

Clubs and locations as of the 2013–14 season:

Poland

 Country: 
 Association: Polish Football Association
 Top-level league: Ekstraklasa (futsal)
 UEFA ranking:

Clubs and locations as of the 2013–14 season:

Portugal

 Country: 
 Association: Portuguese Football Federation
 Top-level league: Liga Portuguesa de Futsal
 UEFA ranking: 3rd

Clubs and locations as of the 2013–14 season:

Republic of Ireland
 Country: 
 Association: Football Association of Ireland
 Top-level league: Emerald Futsal League
 UEFA ranking:
2014–15 Emerald Futsal League

Republic of Macedonia

 Country: 
 Association: Football Federation of Macedonia
 Top-level league: Macedonian Futsal First League
 UEFA ranking:

Clubs and locations as of the 2013–14 season:

Romania

 Country: 
 Association: Romanian Football Federation
 Top-level league: Liga I (futsal)
 UEFA ranking:

Clubs and locations as of the 2013–14 season:

Russia

 Country: 
 Association: Football Union of Russia
 Top-level league: Russian Futsal Super League 
 UEFA ranking: 4th

Clubs and locations as of the 2013–14 season:

San Marino
 Country: 
 Association: San Marino Football Federation
 League: Sammarinese Futsal Championship 
 UEFA ranking:

Scotland

 Country: 
 Association: Scottish Football Association
 Top-level league: Scottish Futsal League
 UEFA ranking:

Serbia

 Country: 
 Association: Football Association of Serbia
 Top-level league: Serbian Prva Futsal Liga
 UEFA ranking: 7th

Clubs and locations as of the 2013–14 season:

Slovakia

 Country: 
 Association: Slovak Football Association
 Top-level league: Slovak Futsal Extraliga
 UEFA ranking: 14th

Clubs and locations as of the 2013–14 season:

Slovenia

 Country: 
 Association: Football Association of Slovenia
 Top-level league: Slovenian Futsal League
 UEFA ranking: 9th

As of the 2022–23 season

Spain

 Country: 
 Association: Royal Spanish Football Federation
 Top-level league: Primera División de Futsal
 UEFA ranking: 1st

Clubs and locations as of the 2013–14 season:

Sweden

 Country: 
 Association: Swedish Football Association
 Top-level league: Swedish Futsal Championship
 UEFA ranking:

Switzerland

 Country: 
 Association: Swiss Football Association
 Top-level league: Swiss Futsal Championship
 UEFA ranking:

Play-off

Turkey

 Country: 
 Association: Turkish Football Federation
 Top-level league: Turkish Futsal League
 UEFA ranking:

Ukraine

 Country: 
 Association: Football Federation of Ukraine
 Top-level league: Extra-Liga 
 UEFA ranking: 6th

Clubs and locations as of the 2013–14 season:

Wales

 Country: 
 Association: Football Association of Wales
 Top-level league: None
 Top-level championship: Welsh Futsal Cup 
 UEFA ranking:

References

UEFA.com

See also
List of top-division futsal clubs in AFC countries

European clubs